Duluth is a port city in the U.S. state of Minnesota and the county seat of St. Louis County. Located on Lake Superior in Minnesota's Arrowhead Region, the city is a hub for cargo shipping. Commodities shipped from the Port of Duluth include coal, iron ore, grain, limestone, cement, salt, wood pulp, steel coil, and wind turbine components. Duluth is south of the Iron Range and the Boundary Waters Canoe Area Wilderness.

Duluth is named after Daniel Greysolon, Sieur du Lhut, the area's first known European explorer. The population was 86,697 at the 2020 census, making it Minnesota's fifth-largest city. Duluth forms a metropolitan area with neighboring Superior, Wisconsin. The two cities are commonly called the Twin Ports.

The Port of Duluth is the world's farthest inland port accessible to oceangoing ships, and by far the largest and busiest port on the Great Lakes. The port is among the top 20 U.S. ports by tonnage.

A tourist destination for the Midwest, Duluth has the nation's only all-freshwater aquarium, the Great Lakes Aquarium; the Aerial Lift Bridge, which is adjacent to Canal Park and spans the Duluth Ship Canal into the Duluth–Superior harbor; and Minnesota Point (known locally as Park Point), the world's longest freshwater baymouth bar, spanning . The city is also the starting point for vehicle trips touring the North Shore of Lake Superior toward Thunder Bay, Ontario, Canada.

History

Native history

The Ojibwe occupied a historic settlement at Onigamiinsing ("at the little portage"), the portage across Minnesota Point between Lake Superior and western St. Louis Bay, which forms Duluth's harbor. For both the Ojibwe and the Dakota, interaction with Europeans during the contact period revolved around the fur trade and related activities.

According to Ojibwe oral history, Spirit Island, near the Spirit Valley neighborhood, was the "Sixth Stopping Place", where the northern and southern branches of the Ojibwe Nation came together and proceeded to their "Seventh Stopping Place", near the present city of La Pointe, Wisconsin. The "Stopping Places" were the places the Native Americans occupied during their westward migration as the Europeans overran their territory.

Exploration and fur trade

Several factors brought fur traders to the Great Lakes in the early 17th century. The fashion for beaver hats in Europe generated demand for pelts. French trade for beaver in the lower St. Lawrence River led to the depletion of the animals in the region by the late 1630s, so the French searched farther west for new resources and new routes, making alliances with the Native Americans along the way to trap and deliver their furs.

Étienne Brûlé is credited with the European discovery of Lake Superior before 1620. Pierre-Esprit Radisson and Médard des Groseilliers explored the Duluth area, Fond du Lac (Bottom of the Lake) in 1654 and again in 1660. The French soon established fur posts near Duluth and in the far north where Grand Portage became a major trading center. The French explorer Daniel Greysolon, Sieur du Lhut, whose name is sometimes anglicized as "DuLuth", explored the St. Louis River in 1679.

After 1792 and the independence of the United States, the North West Company established several posts on Minnesota rivers and lakes, and in areas to the west and northwest, for trading with the Ojibwe, the Dakota, and other native tribes. The first post was where Superior, Wisconsin, later developed. Known as Fort St. Louis, the post became the headquarters for North West's new Fond du Lac Department. Over time, Indian peoples and European Americans settled nearby, and a town gradually developed at this point.

In 1808, German-born John Jacob Astor organized the American Fur Company. The company began trading at the Head of the Lakes in 1809. In 1817, it erected a new headquarters at present-day Fond du Lac on the St. Louis River. There, portages connected Lake Superior with Lake Vermilion to the north and with the Mississippi River to the south. After creating a powerful monopoly, Astor got out of the business about 1830, as the trade was declining. But active trade carried on until the failure of the fur trade in the 1840s. European fashions changed, and many American areas were getting over-trapped, with game declining.

In 1832 Henry Schoolcraft visited the Fond du Lac area and wrote of his experiences with the Ojibwe Indians there. Henry Wadsworth Longfellow based the Song of Hiawatha, his epic poem relating the fictional adventures of an Ojibwe warrior named Hiawatha and the tragedy of his love for Minnehaha, a Dakota woman, on Schoolcraft's writings.

Natives signed two Treaties of Fond du Lac with the United States in the present neighborhood of Fond du Lac in 1826 and 1847, in which the Ojibwe ceded land to the American government. As part of the Treaty of Washington (1854) with the Lake Superior Band of Chippewa, the United States set aside the Fond du Lac Indian Reservation upstream from Duluth near Cloquet, Minnesota.

Permanent settlement

As European Americans continued to settle and encroach on Ojibwe lands, the U.S. government made a series of treaties, executed between 1837 and 1889, that expropriated vast areas of tribal lands for their use and relegated the Native American peoples to a number of small reservations. Interest in the area was piqued in the 1850s by rumors of copper mining. A government land survey in 1852, followed by a treaty with local tribes in 1854, secured wilderness for gold-seeking explorers, sparked a land rush, and led to the development of iron ore mining in the area. The 1854 Ojibwe Land Cession Treaty would force the Ojibwe onto what are now known as the Fond du Lac and Grand Portage Reservations, though some land rights such as hunting and fishing were retained.

Around the same time, newly constructed channels and locks in the East permitted large ships to access the area. A road connecting Duluth to the Twin Cities was also constructed. Eleven small towns on both sides of the St. Louis River were formed, establishing Duluth's roots as a city.

By 1857, copper resources were scarce and the area's economic focus shifted to timber harvesting. A nationwide financial crisis, the Panic of 1857, caused most of the city's early pioneers to leave. A history of Duluth written in 1910 relates, "Of the handful remaining in 1859 four men were unemployed and one of those was a brewer.  Capital idea; build a brewery. The absence of malt and hops and barley did not at all embarrass those stout-hearted settlers." The water for brewing was obtained from a stream that emptied into Lake Superior that came to be called Brewery Creek, as it is still known today. While the brewery "was not a pecuniary success", a few decades later it became the Fitger Brewing Company.

The opening of the canal at Sault Ste. Marie in 1855 and the contemporaneous announcement of the railroads' approach had made Duluth the only port  with access to both the Atlantic and Pacific oceans. Soon the lumber industry, railroads and mining were all growing so quickly that the influx of workers could hardly keep up with demand, and storefronts popped up almost overnight. By 1868, business in Duluth was booming. In a Fourth of July speech Dr. Thomas Preston Foster, the founder of Duluth's first newspaper, coined the expression "The Zenith City of the Unsalted Seas".

In 1869–70, Duluth was the fastest-growing city in the country and was expected to surpass Chicago in only a few years. When Jay Cooke, a wealthy Philadelphia land speculator, convinced the Lake Superior and Mississippi Railroad to create an extension from St. Paul to Duluth, the railroad opened areas due north and west of Lake Superior to iron ore mining. Duluth's population on New Year's Day of 1869 consisted of 14 families; by the Fourth of July, 3,500 people were present to celebrate.

In the first Duluth Minnesotian printed on August 24, 1869, the editor placed the following notice on the editorial page:

In 1873, Cooke's empire crumbled and the stock market crashed, and Duluth almost disappeared from the map. But by the late 1870s, with the continued boom in lumber and mining and with the railroads completed, Duluth bloomed again. By the turn of the century, it had almost 100,000 inhabitants, and was again a thriving community with small-business loans, commerce and trade flowing through the city. Mining continued in the Mesabi Range and iron was shipped east to mills in Ohio, a trade continuing into the 20th century.

"The Untold Delights of Duluth"
Early doubts about the Duluth area's potential were voiced in "The Untold Delights of Duluth," a speech U.S. Representative J. Proctor Knott of Kentucky gave in the U.S. House of Representatives on January 27, 1871. His speech opposing the St. Croix and Superior Land Grant lampooned Western boosterism, portraying Duluth as an Eden in fantastically florid terms. The speech has been reprinted in collections of folklore and humorous speeches and is regarded as a classic. The nearby city of Proctor, Minnesota, is named for Knott.

Duluth's unofficial sister city, Duluth, Georgia, got its name in 1871, shortly after Knott's speech gained national attention. Prominent Georgia newspaperman and politician Evan P. Howell was called upon to make remarks at the dedication of a new railroad line into Howell's Crossing, a village named for his grandfather. Howell humorously suggested that the community be called "Duluth" instead, and townspeople agreed.

Proctor Knott is sometimes credited with characterizing Duluth as the "zenith city of the unsalted seas," but the honor for that coinage belongs to journalist Thomas Preston Foster, speaking at a Fourth of July picnic in 1868.

20th century

During the 20th century, the Port of Duluth was for a time the busiest port in the United States, surpassing even New York City in gross tonnage. Lake freighters carried iron ore through the Great Lakes to processing plants in Illinois and Ohio. Ten newspapers, six banks and an 11-story skyscraper, the Torrey Building, were founded and built. As of 1905, Duluth was said to be home to the most millionaires per capita in the United States.

In 1907, U.S. Steel announced that it would build a $5 million plant in the area. Although steel production did not begin until 1915, predictions held that Duluth's population would rise to 200,000–300,000. Along with the Duluth Works steel plant, US Steel developed Morgan Park, as a company town for steel workers. It is now a city neighborhood within Duluth.

The Diamond Calk Horseshoe Company was founded in 1908 and later became a major manufacturer and exporter of wrenches and automotive tools. Duluth's huge wholesale Marshall Wells Hardware Company expanded in 1901 by opening branches in Portland, Oregon, and Winnipeg, Manitoba; the company catalog totaled 2,390 pages by 1913. The Duluth Showcase Company, which later became the Duluth Refrigerator Company and then the Coolerator Company, was established in 1908. The Universal Atlas Cement Company, which made cement from the slag byproduct of the steel plant, began operations in 1917.

Immigration
Because of its numerous jobs in mining and industry, the city was a destination for large waves of immigrants from Europe during the early 20th century. It became the center of one of the largest Finnish communities in the world outside Finland. For decades, a Finnish-language daily newspaper, Päivälehti, was published in the city, named after the former Grand Duchy of Finland's pro-independence leftist paper. The Finnish community of Industrial Workers of the World (IWW) members published a widely read labor newspaper Industrialisti. From 1907 to 1941, the Finnish Socialist Federation and then the IWW operated Work People's College, an educational institution that taught classes from a working-class, socialist perspective.
Immigrants from Sweden, Norway, Denmark, Germany, Austria, Czechoslovakia, Ireland, England, Italy, Poland, Hungary, Bulgaria, Croatia, Serbia, Ukraine, Romania, and Russia also settled in Duluth. At one time, Duluth was home to several historic immigrant neighborhoods, including Little Italy. Today, people of Scandinavian descent constitute a strong plurality of Duluth's population, accounting for more than one third of the residents identifying European ancestry.

Duluth lynchings
In September 1918 a group calling itself the Knights of Liberty dragged Finnish immigrant Olli Kinkkonen from his boarding house, tarred and feathered him, and lynched him. Kinkkonen did not want to fight in World War I and had planned to return to Finland. His body was found two weeks later hanging in a tree in Duluth's Lester Park.

Another lynching in Duluth occurred on June 15, 1920, when three innocent black male circus workers: Elias Clayton, Elmer Jackson, and Isaac McGhie, were attacked by a white mob and hanged after allegedly raping a teenage white girl. The Duluth lynchings took place on First Street and Second Avenue East. In the late 20th century, journalist Michael Fedo wrote The Lynchings in Duluth (1970), which began to raise awareness of the event. Community members from many different groups began to come together for reflection and education.  The men's unmarked graves were located and in 1991, gravestones were erected with funding from a local church. Vigils were held at the intersection where the men were lynched. In 2000, a grassroots committee was formed, and began to offer speakers to groups and schools. It decided to commemorate the event with a memorial. The Clayton Jackson McGhie Memorial, which includes a corner wall and plaza, was dedicated in 2003. It includes three -tall bronze statues of the three men. The CJMM Committee continues to work for racial justice through educational outreach, community forums, and scholarships for youth.

1918 Cloquet Fire
In 1918, the Cloquet Fire (named for the nearby city of Cloquet) burned across Carlton and southern St. Louis counties, destroying dozens of communities in the Duluth area. The fire was the worst natural disaster in Minnesota history in terms of the number of lives lost in a single day. Many people died on the rural roads surrounding the Duluth area, and historical accounts tell of victims dying while trying to outrun the fire. The News Tribune reported, "It is estimated that 100 families were rendered homeless by Saturday's fire in the territory known as the Woodland District... In most cases, families which lost their homes also lost most or all of their furniture and personal belongings, the limited time and transportation facilities affording little opportunity for saving anything but human life." The National Guard unit based in Duluth was mobilized in a heroic effort to battle the fire and assist victims, but the troops were overwhelmed by the enormity of the fire.

Retired Duluth News Tribune columnist and journalist Jim Heffernan writes that his mother "recalled an overnight vigil watching out the window of their small home on lower Piedmont Avenue with her father, her younger sisters having gone to sleep, ready to be evacuated to the waterfront should the need arise. The fire never made it that far down the hill, but devastated what is now Piedmont Heights, and, of course, a widespread area of Northeastern Minnesota." In the fire's aftermath, tens of thousands of people were left injured or homeless; many of the refugees fled into the city for aid and shelter.

Continued growth

For the first half of the 20th century, Duluth was an industrial port boom town dominated by its several grain elevators, a cement plant, a nail mill, wire mills, and the Duluth Works plant. Handling and export of iron ore, brought in from the Mesabi Range, was integral to the city's economy, as well as to the steel industry in the Midwest, including in manufacturing cities in Ohio.

The Aerial Lift Bridge (earlier known as the "Aerial Bridge" or "Aerial Ferry Bridge") was built in 1905 and at that time was known as the United States' first transporter bridge—only one other was ever constructed in the country. In 1929–30, the span was converted to a vertical-lift bridge (also rather uncommon).  The bridge was added to the National Register of Historic Places  in 1973.

In 1916, after Europe had entered the Great War (World War I), a shipyard was constructed on the St. Louis River. A new workers neighborhood, today known as Riverside, developed around the large operation. Similar industrial expansions took place during the Second World War, as Duluth's large harbor and the area's vast natural resources were put to work for the war effort. Tankers and submarine chasers (usually called "sub-chasers") were built at the Riverside shipyard. The population of Duluth continued to grow in the postwar decade and a half, peaking at 107,884 in 1960.

Economic decline
Economic decline began in the 1950s, when high-grade iron ore ran out on the Iron Range north of Duluth; ore shipments from the Duluth harbor had been critical to the city's economy. Low-grade ore (taconite) shipments continued, boosted by new taconite pellet technology, but ore shipments were lower overall.

In the 1970s the United States experienced a steel crisis, a recession in the global steel market, and like many American cities Duluth entered a period of industrial restructuring. In 1981, US Steel closed its Duluth Works plant, a blow to the city's economy whose effects included the closure of the cement company, which had depended on the steel plant for raw materials (slag). More closures followed in other industries, including shipbuilding and heavy machinery. By decade's end, unemployment rates hit 15 percent. The economic downturn was particularly hard on Duluth's West Side, where ethnic Eastern and Southern European workers had lived for decades.

During the 1980s, plans were underway to extend Interstate 35 through Duluth and up the North Shore, bringing new access to the city. The original plan called for the interstate to run along the shore on an elevated concrete structure, blocking the city's access to Lake Superior. Kent Worley, a local landscape architect, wrote an impassioned letter to then mayor Ben Boo asking that the route be reconsidered.  The Minnesota Department of Transportation agreed to take another look, with Worley consulting. The new plan called for parts of the highway to run through tunnels, which allowed preservation of Fitger's Brewery, Sir Ben's Tavern, Leif Erickson Park, and Duluth's Rose Garden. Rock used from the interstate project was used to create an extensive new beach along Lake Superior, along which the city's Lakewalk was built.

21st-century development

With the decline of the city's industrial core, the local economic focus gradually shifted to tourism. The downtown area was renovated to emphasize its pedestrian character: streets were paved with red brick and skywalks and retail shops were added. The city and developers worked with the area's unique architectural character, converting old warehouses along the waterfront into cafés, shops, restaurants, and hotels. Combined with the new rock beach and Lakewalk, these changes developed the new Canal Park as a tourism-oriented district. Duluth's population, which had declined since 1960, stabilized at around 85,000.

At the beginning of the 21st century, Duluth has become a regional center for banking, retail shopping, and medical care for northern Minnesota, northern Wisconsin, and northwestern Michigan. It is estimated that more than 8,000 jobs in Duluth are directly related to its two hospitals. Arts and entertainment offerings, as well as year-round recreation and the natural environment, have contributed to expansion of the tourist industry. Some 3.5 million visitors each year contribute more than $400 million to the local economy.

More recently a collection of like-minded businesses in Lincoln Park, an old rundown blue-collar neighborhood with high unemployment and poverty rates, was cultivated by a group of entrepreneurs who have begun rebuilding and revitalizing the area. Since 2014 at least 25 commercial real estate transactions have occurred and 17 businesses have opened, including restaurants, breweries, coffee shops and artist studios. Due to the neighborhood's revitalization, many developers are also investing in housing projects in anticipation of further growth.

Waterfront reclamation efforts
Duluth's prominence as a port city gave it an economic advantage in its early years, but as various industries began to wane, new efforts to reclaim areas of the waterfront for public use emerged. Notable among them is the reclamation of the St. Louis River corridor, which runs along the edge of the city's western neighborhoods. Many of these sites, filled with legacy pollutants due to previous industrial use, have been or are in the process of being restored by the EPA, with several developments, such as Pier B Resort and Hotel, demonstrating the revitalization opportunity of these former industrial spaces.

Other efforts to reclaim waterfront space in Duluth have been led by the Duluth Waterfront Collective. One notable example includes the Highway 61 Revisited concept, which seeks to reimagine the I-35 corridor as it runs through the city's downtown. The group's efforts have been met with interest, with the city council voting to explore options for the corridor in 2021.

While the acreage of land utilizing the waterway for port-related purposes has shifted in recent years, the goods being shipped through the Duluth-Superior port have shifted to reflect a changing economy. In recent decades, declines in the shipment of coal and iron ore have been met by increases in the shipment of wind turbine components and multimodal shipping containers.

Geography

It is Minnesota's second-largest city by land area, surpassed only by Hibbing. Duluth's canal connects Lake Superior to the Duluth–Superior harbor and the Saint Louis River. It is spanned by the Aerial Lift Bridge, which connects Canal Park with Minnesota Point (or "Park Point").

Duluth's topography is dominated by a steep hillside that climbs from Lake Superior to high inland elevations. Duluth has been called "the San Francisco of the Midwest," alluding to San Francisco's similar water-to-hilltop topography. This similarity was most evident before World War II, when Duluth had a network of streetcars and an inclined railroad, the 7th Avenue West Incline Railway, that, like San Francisco's cable cars, climbed a steep hill. The change in elevation is illustrated by Duluth's two airports.

Even as the city has grown, its populace has tended to hug Lake Superior's shoreline, so Duluth is primarily a southwest–northeast city. The considerable development on the hill has given Duluth many steep streets. Some neighborhoods, such as Piedmont Heights and Bayview Heights, are atop the hill with scenic views of the city. Skyline Parkway is a scenic roadway that extends from Becks Road above the Gary – New Duluth neighborhood near the western end of the city to the Lester Park neighborhood on the east side. It crosses nearly Duluth's entire length and affords views of Lake Superior, the Aerial Lift Bridge, Canal Park, and the many industries that inhabit the largest inland port.

A developing part of the city is the Miller Hill Mall area and the adjacent big-box retailer shopping strips "over the hill" along the Miller Trunk Highway corridor. The 2009–10 road reconstruction project in Duluth's Miller Hill area improved movement through the U.S. Highway 53 corridor from Trinity Road to Maple Grove Road. The highway project reconstructed connector roads, intersections, and adjacent roadways. A new international airport terminal was completed in 2013 as part of the federal government's Stimulus Reconstruction Program.

Geological history

The geology of Duluth demonstrates the Midcontinent Rift, formed as the North American continent began to split apart about 1.1 billion years ago. As the earth's crust thinned, magma rose toward the surface. These intrusions formed a -thick sill, primarily of gabbro, which is known as the Duluth Complex. An intrusion of the Duluth Complex can be seen at Enger Tower, which is built on a knob of exposed gabbro.

The lava flows formed the conditions for the creation of Lake Superior agates. As the lava solidified, gas trapped within the flows formed an amygdaloidal texture (literally, rock filled with small vesicles). Later, groundwater transported dissolved minerals through the vesicles depositing concentric bands of fine-grained quartz called chalcedony.  The color scheme is caused by the concentration of iron present in the groundwater at the time that each new layer was being deposited.  The process went on until the cavity had been completely filled. Over time erosion freed the agates from the solidified lava, which is not as hard as quartz.  Lake Superior agates are the Minnesota gemstone.

The creation of the Lake Superior basin reflects the erosive power of continental glaciers that advanced and retreated over Minnesota several times in the past 2 million years. The mile-thick ice sheets easily eroded the sandstone that filled the axis of the rift valley but encountered more resistance from the igneous rocks forming the flanks of the rift, now the margins of the lake basin. The sandstone that buried the igneous rocks of the rift is exposed near Fond du Lac. At one time a large number of quarries produced the stone, sold as Fond du Lac or Lake Superior brownstone. It was widely used in Duluth buildings and also shipped to Minneapolis, Chicago, and Milwaukee, where it was also used extensively. The weathered sandstone forms the sandy lake bottom and shores of Park Point.

Climate

Duluth has a humid continental climate (Köppen Dfb), slightly moderated by its proximity to Lake Superior. Winters are long, snowy, and very cold, normally seeing maximum temperatures remaining at or below  on 100 days (the second-most of any city in the contiguous US behind International Falls), falling to or below  on 38 nights and bringing consistent snow cover from late November to early April. The lake steams in the winter when moist, lake-warmed air at the surface rises and cools, losing some of its moisture-carrying capacity.

Duluth has been called "The Air-Conditioned City" because of the summertime cooling effect of Lake Superior. Using data on the minimum monthly temperature between 1981 and 2010, the National Oceanic and Atmospheric Administration developed a Comparative Climatic Data report.

Summers are warm, although nights are generally cool, with daytime temperatures averaging  in July, with that figure being a few degrees warmer inland. Temperatures reach or exceed  on average, only two days per year, while the city has officially seen  temperatures on only three days, all during the July 1936 heat wave, part of the Dust Bowl years. The phrase "cooler by the lake" can be heard often in weather forecasts during the summer, especially on days when an easterly wind is expected. Great local variations are also common because of the rapid change in elevation between the nearly  hilltop and shoreside. Often this variation manifests itself as snow in higher elevations while rain falls near Lake Superior.

On average, the first freezing temperature occurs on September 30, and the last on May 14, although a freezing temperature has occurred in August; the average window for measurable (≥) snowfall is October 22 through April 26.

2012 flooding
Combined with its rocky sediments, hard soil and 43 streams and creeks, the city could not handle the massive rainfall. Mayor Don Ness declared a state of emergency, asking for national assistance. Minnesota Governor Mark Dayton declared a state of emergency, sending the National Guard and the Red Cross to assist in the relief efforts. Several sinkholes opened throughout the city, causing massive property damage. Several feet of standing water accumulated in many city alleys and parking lots. Streets were turned into rapids and many roads split apart due to the heavy flow of water. A portion of West Skyline Parkway tumbled down the hill, isolating a neighborhood. The Saint Louis River, in Duluth's Fond du Lac neighborhood, flooded Highway 23, isolating that neighborhood as well, and damaging roadways and bridges.

The Lake Superior Zoo flooded in the early hours of June 20; 11 barnyard animals drowned, as did a turkey vulture, a raven and a snowy owl. The rising waters enabled a polar bear to escape her exhibit, though she was quickly found on zoo grounds, tranquilized and moved to safety. Two harbor seals escaped the zoo grounds but were later found on Grand Avenue. All three animals were moved to Como Park Zoo in Saint Paul for a temporary, but indeterminate, amount of time. The polar bear was transferred to the Kansas City Zoo in late 2012 as part of the American Zoological Association's (AZA) Species Survival Program breeding recommendation.

2012 tornado
Tornadoes are uncommon in Duluth, considering its latitude and location next to the climate-moderating Lake Superior. However, on August 9, 2012, at around 11 AM, a tornado touched down on Minnesota Point. It had originally started as a waterspout in Superior Bay,  from Sky Harbor Airport, but briefly found its way onto the sandbar's shoreline, making it a true tornado. It quickly dissipated, but soon touched down again on Superior's Barker's Island, where it again quickly dissipated. It caused no serious damage; the tornado was categorized as an EF0 on the Enhanced Fujita Scale. At the time the National Weather Service reported that it was Duluth's first tornado. Further investigation showed that more than  years ago, on May 26, 1958, Duluth had a "miniature tornado" that collapsed a garage and damaged two area lake cabins. It lasted only five minutes. The News-Tribune reported a possible twister on July 11, 1935: "Swirling into the city on the wings of a torrential rain, a miniature tornado struck in the heart of the Gary-New Duluth district shortly before 8 a.m. yesterday, flattening a row of coal sheds (and) a frame garage and causing general damage to trees in the vicinity. The United States weather bureau had no means of officially recording the twister, the high wind having limited itself to the Gary-New Duluth district."

Demographics

2020 census
As of the census of 2020, the population was 86,697. The racial makeup of the city was 85.0% White, 3.6% Black or African American, 2.6% Native American, 1.6% Asian, 0.8% from other races, and 6.5% from two or more races. Ethnically, the population was 2.4% Hispanic or Latino of any race. The most common ancestries in Duluth were German (24.0%),  Norwegian (14.2%), Swedish (10.3%), Irish (9.8%), and Polish (6.7%). 95.2% of residents were born in the United States, and 72.7% were born in Minnesota. 95.2% spoke only English at home, and 1.7% spoke Spanish. 94.5% have at least a high school degree, and 39.0% have at least a Bachelor's degree.

2010 census
As of the census of 2010, there were 86,265 people, 35,705 households, and 18,680 families residing in the city. The racial makeup of the city was 90.4% White, 2.3% African American, 2.5% Native American, 1.5% Asian, 0.3% from other races, and 3.0% from two or more races and ethnicities. Hispanic or Latino of any race were 1.5% of the population.

There were 35,705 households, of which 24.2% had children under the age of 18 living with them, 37.2% were married couples living together, 11.2% had a female householder with no husband present, 4.0% had a male householder with no wife present, and 47.7% were non-families. 35.1% of all households were made up of individuals, and 12.1% had someone living alone who was 65 years of age or older. The average household size was 2.23 and the average family size was 2.84.

The median age in the city was 33.6 years. 18.5% of residents were under the age of 18; 19.6% were between the ages of 18 and 24; 23.4% were from 25 to 44; 24.8% were from 45 to 64; and 13.8% were 65 years of age or older. The gender makeup of the city was 49.0% male and 51.0% female.

2000 census
As of the census of 2000, there were 35,500 households and 19,918 families in the city. The racial makeup of the city was 92.7% White, 1.6% Black or African American, 2.4% Native American, 1.1% Asian, 0.0% Pacific Islander, 0.3% from other races, and 1.8% from two or more races. 1.1% of the population was Hispanic or Latino of any race.

Among Duluth's households, 26.6% had children under 18, 41.4% were married couples living together, 11.4% had a female householder with no husband present, and 43.9% were non-families. 34.5% of all households were one-person households, and 13.3% had someone 65 or older living alone. The average household size was 2.26 and the average family size was 2.90.

In the city, the age distribution of the population shows 21.3% under the age of 18, 16.2% from 18 to 24, 26.1% from 25 to 44, 21.3% from 45 to 64, and 15.1% 65 years of age or older. The median age was 35 years. For every 100 females, there were 93.4 males. For every 100 females age 18 and over there were 89.7 males.

Duluth's median household income was $33,766; median family income was $46,394. Males had a median income of $35,182, females $24,965. The per capita income was $18,969. About 8.6% of families and 15.5% of all residents were below the poverty line, including 15.4% of those under 18 and 9.5% of those 65 or over.

Economy

Duluth is the major regional center for health care, higher education, retail, and business services not only of its own immediate area but also of a larger area encompassing northeastern Minnesota, northwestern Wisconsin, and the western Upper Peninsula of Michigan. It is also a major transportation center for the transshipment of coal, taconite, agricultural products, steel, limestone, and cement. In recent years it has seen strong growth in the transshipment of wind turbine components coming and going from manufacturers in both Europe and North Dakota and of oversized industrial machinery manufactured all around the world and destined for the tar sands oil extraction projects in northern Alberta. The Port of Duluth handles an average of 35 million short tons of cargo and nearly 900 vessel visits each year. 90% of the port's vessels are "Lakers," ships that ship goods exclusively among the upper four Great Lakes and are too large to transit the Welland Canal. 10% are "Salties", ships that can traverse the seaway all the way from the Atlantic Ocean.

The Twin Ports has attracted several new engineering firms including TKDA, Barr Engineering, LHB, Enbridge and Lake Superior Consulting, as well as new start-ups in various fields, including Loll Designs and Epicurean, two sister companies that make eco-friendly furniture and kitchen utensils respectively, and microbrewery Bent Paddle. Women's clothing retail chain Maurices is also headquartered in Duluth, as are luggage manufacturers and suppliers Duluth Pack and Frost River. In 1989, the workwear and accessories brand Duluth Trading Company was founded on a barge in the city's shipping district. The company moved its headquarters to southern Wisconsin in 2000.

Duluth is a center for aquatic biology and aquatic science. The city is home to the EPA's Mid-Continent Ecology Division Laboratory and the University of Minnesota–Duluth. These institutions have spawned many economically and scientifically important businesses that support Duluth's economy. A short list of these businesses includes ERA Laboratories, LimnoLogic, the ASci Corporation, Environmental Consulting and Testing, and Ecolab.

The city is popular for tourism. Duluth is a convenient base for trips to the scenic North Shore via Highway 61 and to fishing and wilderness destinations in Minnesota's far north, including the Superior National Forest, Lake Vermilion and the Boundary Waters Canoe Area. Tourists also may drive on the North Shore Scenic Drive to Gooseberry Falls State Park, Baptism Falls (Minnesota's largest waterfall), the vertical cliff of Palisade Head, Isle Royale National Park (reached via ferry), Grand Portage National Monument in Grand Portage, and High Falls of the Pigeon River (on the Canada–US border). Thunder Bay, Ontario, can be reached by following the highway into Canada along Lake Superior.

In 2006, a volunteer task force was formed to manage the spiraling retiree health care benefit obligations that were threatening to bankrupt the city. Mayor Don Ness called it "the single most important volunteer effort in our city's history." After reforming and restructuring the benefits and a court case that went all the way to the Minnesota Supreme Court, in 2013 the liability stood at an estimated $191 million. In 2014, Ness announced "a full solution for the retiree health care issue that once threatened to bankrupt our city."

Aviation

In the summer of 1913, the world's first heavier-than-air airline service opened in the form of a biplane flying boat named Lark of Duluth, offering joyrides over the Duluth harbor. Not a commercial success, the flights ended later that summer when the designer of the aircraft's engine crashed it. After being purchased and used for scheduled flights in Florida, the plane returned to Duluth and other locations for passenger flights in 1914, until it was ultimately damaged in a hard landing later that year in California and pronounced unsalvageable. A replica of the 1913 Lark of Duluth was constructed and flown by the Duluth Aviation Institute in 2013, to commemorate the 100th anniversary of commercial aviation.

Several multinational aviation corporations operate near Duluth. Since 1994, the city has been home to the headquarters and main manufacturing facility of Cirrus Aircraft, whose 1,500-plus employees build the world's best-selling general aviation aircraft, the SR22, and the world's first single-engine personal jet, the Vision SF50. James Fallows, national correspondent for The Atlantic, said that Cirrus' rapid growth in Duluth over the years "was a major, major factor in the town's modern emergence". Former mayor Gary Doty called the arrival of Cirrus in the mid-1990s a "crucial turning point" for Duluth, and said it was "the catalyst for more positive attitudes about the city... If that hadn't happened, then we might really have been in a tailspin." The company is Duluth's largest manufacturer. In January 2012, another aircraft manufacturer, Kestrel Aircraft, maker of the K-350 turboprop plane and later known as ONE Aviation, moved to the Twin Ports; and in October of that year, AAR Corp opened an aircraft repair and maintenance facility at the Duluth airport. Both companies ceased operations in the region during the COVID-19 pandemic.

In January 2013, the Duluth International Airport opened a new terminal, now named the "U.S. Representative James L. Oberstar Terminal" after the late Jim Oberstar.

The Air National Guard's 148th Fighter Wing is based in Duluth and was in 2016 the city's seventh-largest employer. It is one of a handful of National Guard units with an active association, which in the 148th's case means having the capability to provide training for Air Force pilots. The 179th Fighter Squadron is a unit of the 148th.

Arts and culture

The Historic Old Central High School, built in 1892 of locally quarried sandstone at a cost of $460,000, now houses an 1890s classroom museum. It features a  clock tower with chimes patterned after Big Ben in London; the clock faces are each  in diameter, overlooking the Duluth harbor.  It is listed with the National Register of Historic Places; they begin the listing writing, "Old Central is a very fine example of that traditionally rich architectural style known as Romanesque and is certainly the most outstanding structure of its kind to be found in northern Minnesota."

Other museums include the Duluth Children's Museum in the Lincoln Park neighborhood.  Founded in 1930, it is the fifth-oldest of its kind in the nation. It features interactive exhibits, educational programs, and opportunities for creative play designed for children, their families and caregivers, and school field trips. The museum also curates an artifact collection of over 25,000 objects drawn from the lives and cultures of people who have resided in the region, particularly American Indians and immigrants.  Other museums include the Tweed Museum of Art at the University of Minnesota Duluth and the Karpeles Manuscript Library Museum.

The premiere community art center is the Duluth Art Institute, with galleries, a fiber studio and darkroom in the Depot downtown and ceramic and multi-purpose studios in the Lincoln Park neighborhood. A number of local art galleries are also located downtown and in Canal Park. The Duluth Public Library has three locations. Duluth is also home to a professional ballet company, the Minnesota Ballet. Duluth shares a symphony orchestra—the Duluth Superior Symphony Orchestra—with Superior, Wisconsin. In summer free concerts are often held in Chester Park, where local musicians play for crowds. The Bayfront Blues Festival is held in early August.

Duluth is home to several local theater companies, including The Duluth Playhouse, one of the oldest operating community theaters in the United States. Founded in 1914, the Playhouse's main offices and two of its theaters are housed in the historic Depot Building on Michigan Street. The Playhouse has a comprehensive theatrical season across multiple stages, including Duluth's Nor Shor Theater as of April 2018. It also has a renowned education program.

The NorShor Theatre is a historic movie palace on Superior Street that was restored for use as a performance venue. The century-old venue is generally considered a local landmark. After 19 months of construction and renovations, the Norshor opened in 2018 with a 600-seat, stadium-style, balconied, live-performance auditorium, a bar, and a lounge.

Since 2004, Duluth has celebrated Gay Pride with a parade on Labor Day weekend. Since 1998, the city has held the Homegrown Music Festival the first week in May. The festival features over 170 local musical acts performing across the city. The Junior Achievement High School ROCKS – Battle of the Bands showcases middle school and high school bands from central Minnesota to the Canada–US border and northern Wisconsin and takes place at the DECC in mid-April. Duluth also hosts the Northeastern Minnesota Book Awards, honoring books about the region.

Attractions

Canal Park is a district with recreation activities, restaurants, cafés, hotels, and shops, especially those dealing in antiques. Formerly a warehouse district, the area converted to a recreation-oriented district following the decline in manufacturing in the 1980s. A  walking path offers views of Park Point's sand dunes and swimming beaches and the lighthouse pier.
The path passes under the Aerial Lift Bridge, a vertical lift bridge spanning the Duluth Ship Canal into Duluth's harbor. It was originally an exceedingly rare aerial transfer bridge—a bridge that slides a basketlike "gondola" back and forth to transfer people and vehicles from one side to the other. The wreck of the Thomas Wilson, a classic early-20th-century whaleback ore boat, lies underwater less than  outside the Duluth harbor ship canal.

The Duluth Lakewalk, expanded and improved beginning in the 1980s, is a seven-mile walking/biking path that begins in Canal Park and follows the lakeshore, crossing through Leif Erickson Park and the Duluth Rose Garden, and ending at the Bayfront Festival Park, an area with a covered pavilion where festivals, concerts, and other events are held.

Duluth is the starting point for the North Shore of Lake Superior scenic route that runs from Duluth, at the southwestern end of the lake, to Thunder Bay and Nipigon in the north and Sault Ste. Marie in the east. The route was already a popular tourist destination after 1855 when the Great Lakes lock system first allowed steamboats onto the lake and eastern tourists began to travel onto Lake Superior for recreational purposes. By the mid-1870s, many excursion boats, coastal steamers, and ferries ran along the North Shore, primarily out of Duluth and Thunder Bay. After docking in Duluth they canoed or were ferried up the North Shore, staying in hunting and fishing camps, and later hotels and small cabins.

Great Lakes Aquarium

The Great Lakes Aquarium is in the Duluth Waterfront Park. A freshwater aquarium, it features animals and habitats found in the Great Lakes Basin and other freshwater ecosystems such as the Amazon River. The aquarium houses 205 different species of fish, birds, reptiles, amphibians and mammals. It is one of the few aquariums in the United States to focus on freshwater exhibits.

Lake Superior Maritime Museum and Visitor Center
The Great Lakes Maritime Museum and Visitor Center contains historical exhibits, maritime artifacts, and a recreation of a ship's pilot house, cabins, and staterooms with life-size mannequins that speak to the visitors. In the pilot house children can pretend to command the ship using a ship's steering wheel and other instruments. The exhibits contain artifacts from the many sunken ships in the Duluth harbor. One exhibit tells the story of the Edmund Fitzgerald, which sank in a November gale after departing from the Duluth Superior port. There is a small movie theater and a viewing room where visitors can watch the ships arriving in the harbor and find arrival times of the ships that will arrive throughout the day.

William A. Irvin Ship Museum
After transporting coal and iron in the Great Lakes for more than 40 years, the S.S. William A. Irvin was docked in Duluth and serves as a preserved example of the shipping history of the Great Lakes. As the flagship of U.S. Steel's Great Lakes Fleet, she provided what has been called the "comfort and elegance to dignitaries and guests who traveled the Lakes with her" while hauling materials from Two Harbors and Duluth to U.S. Steel's mills of Lakes Michigan and Erie in Ohio and Indiana.

Lake Superior Railroad Museum

The Lake Superior Railroad Museum is in the Duluth Union Depot. It has seven steam, 14 diesel, and two electric locomotives, and over 40 other pieces of rolling stock. The collection includes the William Crooks, the first locomotive to operate in the state of Minnesota, and the Duluth, Missabe and Iron Range Railway Number 227, a "Yellowstone" locomotive that was among the largest steam engines ever. Only 18 Yellowstones were ever built, and Duluth exhibits one of the three that remain.

North Shore Scenic Railroad
The North Shore Scenic Railroad is a heritage railroad that operates between Duluth and Two Harbors, Minnesota. It is owned by the Lake Superior Railroad Museum and offers several different types of passenger excursion trains between May 28 and October 15 each year. The railroad was started in 1990, using the Lakefront Line once owned by the Duluth, Missabe and Iron Range Railway.

Fitger's Brewery

The original brewery was built in 1857 on a stream that came to be known as Brewery Creek; it was purchased by Michael Fink in 1881 and moved downstream to its present location on Superior Street. Fink's Lake Superior Brewery hired a new brewmaster, August Fitger, a graduate of one of Germany's premier brewing schools, and the brewery was renamed A. Fitger & Co. / Lake Superior Brewery. The brewery was successful and stayed in operation even through prohibition but finally closed in 1972 after 115 years of continual operation, making it the oldest business in Duluth. The complex was reopened in 1984 and contains a craft brewery, several restaurants, hotels, shops, and a museum. Fitger's Brewery Complex is listed in the National Register of Historic Places.

Glensheen Mansion

The Glensheen Historic Estate, on the shore of Lake Superior, was built as the family home for wealthy businessman Chester Adgate Congdon. The building was designed by Minnesota architect Clarence H. Johnston Sr., with interiors designed by William French. The formal terraced garden and English-style landscape was designed by the Charles Wellford Leavitt firm of New York. Construction began in 1905 at a cost of $854,000 (about $ in  dollars), and was completed in 1908. Aside from its architectural significance, Glensheen is noteworthy for the murders of Elisabeth Congdon and her nurse on June 27, 1977. The mansion is open to tours year-round.

Lake Superior Zoo
The 16-acre Lake Superior Zoo offers year-round recreational activities and features animals from around the world, including Amur tigers, snow leopards, African lions, brown bears, kangaroos, gray wolves, and a variety of birds, reptiles, primates and barnyard animals. The zoo offers learning programs and regularly features special events.

Enger Tower

The tower provides panoramic views of the Twin Ports from lookouts accessible by stairs, and a green beacon is mounted atop the tower.

Hawk Ridge fall raptor count
Duluth is in the path of many avian flyways and migratory birds, which pass over the area in great numbers. Hawk Ridge, on Skyline Parkway, is ideal for viewing migratory raptors. According to the Minnesota Department of Natural Resources, Hawk Ridge has attracted visitors from all 50 states and 40 countries, from Labor Day through October. Volunteers and licensed bird banders capture raptors in nets and band them while large crowds gather to observe the capture and release.

Gichi-Ode' Akiing
Just off the Lakewalk is a park named Gichi-Ode' Akiing, Ojibwe for "a grand heart place." The Duluth City Council approved the name change from Lake Place Park in 2018. A memorial to Kechewaishke, also known as Chief Buffalo, honors his symbolic petition carried to president Millard Fillmore in 1849. Kechewaishke signed the 1854 Treaty of La Pointe a year before his death, with the provision that  of land at the corner of Lake Superior be given to his adopted son Benjamin G. Armstrong. Known as the Buffalo Tract, Armstrong's land comprised part of today's downtown Duluth.

Events

John Beargrease Sled Dog Marathon

The John Beargrease Sled Dog Marathon, named for winter mail carrier John Beargrease, is an annual sled dog race that runs from Duluth to Grand Portage. Beargrease and his brothers were among the first to carry mail between Two Harbors and Grand Marais, going by dogsled, boat, and horse for almost 20 years before the towns were connected by road. Competitors can choose between two distances: a  round trip between Duluth and the Boundary Waters Canoe Area, and a  course from Duluth to Tofte. The race begins at Billy's Bar in northeastern Duluth. Run every January since 1980, it is regarded as a training ground for Alaska's larger and more elite Iditarod Trail Sled Dog Race.

Magic Smelt Parade
In May, Duluthians celebrate the annual smelt run with the Magic Smelt Parade along the city's lakewalk. It is a family-oriented affair conducted in the manner of a New Orleans Second Line Parade, with a "Main Line" led by a small brass band followed by the "second liners", who walk and dance behind the band. The Smelt Parade's second liners wear silver hats, capes, and other costumes related to smelt. A Smelt King and Smelt Queens also take part in the parade.

Grandma's Marathon

Since 1977, Duluth has played host to Grandma's Marathon, held annually in June. Named after its original sponsor, Grandma's Restaurant, it draws runners from all over the world. The course starts just outside Two Harbors, Minnesota, runs down Old Highway 61 (the former route of Highway 61 along the North Shore of Lake Superior), and finishes in one of Duluth's tourism neighborhoods, Canal Park. The same route is also taken during the North Shore Inline Marathon, held in September and also drawing racers from all over the world.

Christmas City of the North Parade
Each year in November, the Christmas City of the North Parade takes place in Duluth. The parade dates to 1957, when the holiday shopping season ran particularly short. Wanting to extend Christmas shopping days, Bob Rich, who at the time owned the former WDSM-TV, now KBJR-TV, came up with the idea. Since then, the parade has marched through downtown Duluth annually on the Friday night before Thanksgiving. The event has survived pouring rain, snow and frigid cold. Even in years when instruments were too cold to produce music, the bands became choirs, using their voices to entertain the crowd. Recorded by Merv Griffin in 1962, the "Christmas City" song is the parade's signature sound. According to Rich's grandson, the song was written by a local resident and his grandfather asked his friend Griffin, at that time not the well-known TV personality he later became, if he would sing the song and put it to music.

Bentleyville Tour of Lights

Since 2009, the Bentleyville Tour of Lights decorates the Bayfront Festival Park during November and December with over 5,000,000 lights. It has been called the United States'  "largest display of Christmas lights that patrons can walk around".

Sports

Professional sports history

Duluth fielded a National Football League team called the Kelleys (officially the Kelley Duluths after the Kelley-Duluth Hardware Store) from 1923 to 1925 and the Eskimos (officially Ernie Nevers' Eskimos after the early NFL great, their star player) from 1926 to 1927. The Eskimos were then sold and became the Orange Tornadoes (Orange, New Jersey). This bit of history became the basis for the 2008 George Clooney/Renée Zellweger movie, Leatherheads.

The Duluth–Superior Dukes of the Northern League Independent Professional Baseball played in West Duluth's Wade Stadium from the league's inception in 1993 until 2002 when the team moved to Kansas City, Kansas, and became the Kansas City T-Bones. The Dukes were Northern League champions in 1997. An earlier Northern League, based in the Midwest, was also in operation off and on from 1902 to 1971, the longest stint being 1932–1971. The Dukes were a farm team for the Detroit Tigers from 1960 to 1964 and several other teams in later years before the Northern League folded in 1971. The Dukes produced notable players such as Denny McLain, Bill Freehan, Gates Brown, Ray Oyler, Jim Northrup, Mickey Stanley, John Hiller, and Willie Horton, all of whom were members of the 1968 world champion Detroit Tigers.

Duluth is also home to Horton's Gym, the home gym of professional boxers Zach "Jungle Boy" Walters and Andy Kolle, as well as a number of other professional prizefighters. Horton's Gym was run by Chuck Horton from 1994 to 2011. During that time, Horton trained some of the most recognized professional and amateur boxers in Minnesota such as Walters, Kolle, RJ Lasse, Gary Eyer and Wayne Putnam. In 2011, Horton turned the gym over to Zach Walters so that Horton could concentrate solely on training professional boxers; Walters changed the gym's name to Jungle Boy Boxing Gym. Horton is currently the trainer of Al Sands; Sands won the North American Boxing Association's U.S. Cruiserweight title in April 2014.

Amateur sports

Hockey

The University of Minnesota Duluth Bulldog hockey games are televised nationally and attended by thousands in person at the Duluth Entertainment Convention Center (DECC). A new hockey arena, Amsoil Arena, opened December 30, 2010, adjacent to the DECC. Several Bulldogs, including hockey great Brett Hull and Matt Niskanen have gone on to success in the National Hockey League. On April 9, 2011, the Bulldog men's team defeated Michigan to win their first national championship in school history. They won the championship again in 2018 and 2019.

The UMD women's ice hockey team has won five NCAA Division I national championships (2001–03, 2008, 2010). The 2010 title game against Cornell University lasted through nearly three full overtimes and was the longest women's ice hockey championship game in NCAA history. The 2003 women's Frozen Four tournament was played at the DECC with the Bulldogs claiming their third consecutive national title by defeating Harvard University via a dramatic double-overtime goal by Nora Tallus in front of a sellout home crowd. The 2008 Frozen Four tournament was also held at the DECC and saw the Bulldogs claim their fourth national title with a 4–0 shutout of the Wisconsin Badgers. The Women's Frozen Four was held in Amsoil Arena in 2012.

Baseball
The Duluth Dukes were an amateur baseball team that played its home games at Bulldog Park on the campus of the University of Minnesota Duluth and at Wade Stadium. The Dukes were composed of current and former college players and former professional players. The Dukes competed in two leagues: the Arrowhead League of the Minnesota Baseball Association, and the Upper 13 League of the Wisconsin Baseball Association.

The Duluth Xpress are an amateur baseball team that plays its games at the Ordean Middle School baseball field. The team is made up of current and former college players and former professional players. The Xpress compete in the Arrowhead League, a class B league in Minnesota town team baseball.

The Duluth Huskies are a college summer wood bat league baseball team based in Duluth and playing in the Northwoods League. The team plays its home games at Wade Stadium. The roster includes some of the top college baseball players in the country. The Huskies play 34 home games each summer between June and August.

The Twin Ports North Stars are an amateur baseball team that plays its games at Ordean Field at Duluth East High School. The North Stars are composed of current and former college and professional baseball players who reside in the Twin Ports area. As of 2013, the North Stars compete out of the Arrowhead League, a Class B league in the Minnesota Baseball Association.

High school teams in the Duluth area include Denfeld High School, Duluth East High School, and Duluth Marshall School.

Rowing

Rowing has a long history in Duluth. The Duluth Boat Club was established in 1886 near the site of the present-day Great Lakes Aquarium. Between 1911 and 1923, Duluth won 20 national championships with several players going on to win perfect scores and remain undefeated in national and international competitions. Today, club membership remains strong, with members competing in regional and national regattas.

Soccer
The National Premier Soccer League team Duluth FC plays its home games at Denfeld High School's Public Schools Stadium.

Bandy
Bandy is a team sport similar to ice hockey.  All American Bandy League matches are played at Guidant John Rose Minnesota Oval in Roseville. In 2012, the Duluth team Dynamo Duluth finished second in the league. and in 2013 they became champions for the first time. In 2009 they won North American Cup, which is rink bandy.

Roller derby
Roller derby is a contact sport played by two teams of five members roller skating in the same direction (counter-clockwise) around a track. The Harbor City Roller Derby, an 18+ league, was founded in 2007 and is Duluth–Superior's first women's flat-track roller derby league.

Curling
The Duluth Curling Club was founded in 1891 and has met in the Duluth Entertainment Convention Center since 1976. The club fielded the 2018 men's Olympic curling gold medal team.

Parks and recreation

Duluth has numerous parks, including six parks on Lake Superior: Leif Erikson Park, which includes a lakeside rose garden; Brighton Beach Park; Canal Park, on Park Point; the Lakewalk (connecting Canal Park and Leif Erickson Park via the lakeshore); and Lafayette Park, on Park Point. The Park Point Recreation Area near the end of Park Point has a community center, numerous pavilions, a swimming beach, sand volleyball court, picnic tables and grills, and a boat launch. Park Point Pine Forest, at the tip of Park Point, is popular for bird-watching in the spring and fall when shorebirds use the area as a resting point during their migration.  A shipping schedule of ships entering the harbor is available as well as five live cams including a cam of the canal, the lift bridge, and the beach.

Other parks include historic Lester Park, one of Duluth's most popular parks. Just upstream from where Amity Creek joins the Lester River, a large, deep pool has formed that attracts cliff diving. Amity Creek is the site of The Seven Bridges Road, a four-mile section of Skyline Parkway where it follows Amity Creek from the top of the bluffs down to Lake Superior. The 400-foot drop has resulted in a long cascade of waterfalls.

Duluth's other parks include Congdon Park, Hartley Park, Chester Park, Bayfront Festival Park, Cascade Park, Enger Park, Lincoln Park, Brewer Park, Fairmount Park, Indian Point Park, Magney–Snively Park, and Fond du Lac Park, as well as some small neighborhood parks and athletic fields. Lester Park, Congdon Park, Hartley Park, and Chester Park have trail systems, and three of these parks—all but Hartley—also have waterfalls, as does Lincoln Park. Hartley Park also has a nature center. Lester Park and Enger Park have public golf courses. Fairmount Park has the Lake Superior Zoo. The park is along the Saint Louis River and is one of Minnesota's ten most visited state parks.

Leif Erikson Park

For many years the Leif Erikson, a Viking ship that was built in Norway by local boat builders to replicate the type of ship sailed by Leif Erikson who arrived in North America around 997 A.D. was on display in the Leif Erickson park. The Dragon's Head and Tail are considered by architects to be masterpieces. The ship was invited to Duluth by Norwegian-American immigrant and businessman H.H. Borgen. Hundreds of people lined the dock to greet the ship as it sailed into the Duluth harbor.

Duluthian Emil Olson purchased the ship soon after the voyage and donated the Leif Erikson to the City of Duluth. The ship was placed on display in Duluth's Lake Park, which was later named Leif Erikson Park.

The Leif Erikson steadily deteriorated after years of neglect and vandalism, and by 1980 was in such poor condition that it was even considered that the ship be burned in the traditional Viking manner of putting a ship to rest. This suggestion inspired Emil Olson's grandson, Will Borg, to bring volunteers together and begin fundraising efforts to restore the ship. Through donations, festivals and other endeavors, the group raised $100,000. Boatbuilders began the restoration in 1991.  Restoration went slowly with starts and stops due to lack of funding.  In  2015 it was announced that restoration had been completed and plans were in place to build a glass structure to house the ship, however as of 2022 the ship remains in storage.

Located within Leif Erikson Park and overlooking Lake Superior, the Duluth Rose Garden is a formal English style garden with more than 3,000 rose bushes and 12,000 non-rose plantings, including day lilies, evergreen shrubs, mixed perennials and an herb garden. The rose varieties are labeled and there are signs that give information on the rose's history and culture. The six-acre garden grows in soil resting over a highway tunnel that encloses the termination point of the freeway entering Duluth. Brick walkways connect all of the beds and there are many benches in the garden that resemble stone sofas.  There is an antique horse fountain and a marble gazebo. The garden is a popular place for summer outdoor weddings.

Recreation
Duluth offers numerous outdoor activities including fishing, hiking, skiing, sailing, canoeing, kayaking, surfing, trail running and mountain biking. In addition to the two public golf courses at Lester and Enger Park, golfers can play at the Northland Country Club and the Ridgeview Country Club. Duluth has five public tennis courts and 63 private tennis club courts. The city has many indoor and outdoor ice rinks, including curling facilities.

The University of Minnesota Duluth Recreational Sport Outdoor Program offers classes in kayak, stand-up paddleboarding, or canoe whitewater river running, and they hold the Annual St. Louis River Whitewater Rendezvous Slalom & Sprint Races in July.  The program also provides sea kayaking and rock climbing lessons for individuals and families.

Superior Hiking and Piedmont Mountain Biking trails
Duluth hosts a  segment of the Superior Hiking Trail, which is also part of the North Country National Scenic Trail – the nation's longest hiking trail. This trail segment passes through Jay Cooke State Park, Ely Peak, Bardon Peak, the Magney–Snively old growth forest, Spirit Mountain, Enger Park, Point of Rocks, the Lakewalk, Chester Park, UMD's Bagley nature trails, and Hartley Park. It features views of the Saint Louis River, the Twin Ports, the Aerial Bridge, and Lake Superior.

The hilly,  Piedmont mountain biking trail crosses numerous bridges and offers scenic views of Duluth and the bay. The trail is recommended for both beginner and intermediate riders.

Skiing

Spirit Mountain opened an alpine coaster in 2010 and in 2011 announced plans to add a zip line, miniature golf, and snow tubing. In 1995 the mountain completed its first NORBA application and in 2012 work began on downhill mountain bike trails.

The Duluth area also has a large and active Nordic skiing community, with many parks providing excellent Nordic skate skiing as well as classic cross-country skiing opportunities.

Chester Bowl, off Skyline Parkway in Chester Park, is a city-owned park with a chairlift, and has the lowest daily lift ticket prices in the nation, at only $6. For decades, Chester Bowl was also known for its ski jumps, which were removed due to safety concerns in 2015.

Sailing and rowing

Duluth has both a yacht and rowing club. Since 1969, the Trans Superior Race has run every other year from Sault Ste. Marie, Ontario, to Duluth. At a distance of almost , it is said to be "the world's longest known freshwater sailboat race".

Duluth has been holding the Tall Ships festivals since 2008.  The events are held every three years and estimates of  250,000 have crowded the shoreline to watch the vintage ships enter the harbor.

Surfing
Surfing is a popular Duluth recreation on Lake Superior shores when conditions are right for producing high waves.
A new documentary film will premiere in 2022 about Duluth's surfing community. UMD offers a course on learning to surf as part of their  Recreational Sports Outdoor Program.  The instructors say that when the wind blows from the Northeast "Duluth becomes a legitimate surf town."  They list Park Point, Lester River and Stony Point as "local hot spots."

Hunting for agates
The Minnesota state gem, the Lake Superior agate, can be found on the shores of Lake Superior, in the streams that run into it, and in gravel pits and road cuts. Duluth's Park Point is an excellent area for hunting. Shorelines and beaches are replenished each year because winter ice and storms push new material up on the shores. Books are available in Duluth to help amateur rock hounds learn more about agates and how to locate them.

Government

Duluth is in Minnesota's 8th congressional district, represented by Pete Stauber of the Republican Party. It has a Mayor–Council form of government. The mayor is Emily Larson, who took office in 2016 as Duluth's first female mayor. The longest-serving mayor in Duluth history is Samuel F. Snively, who served from 1921 to 1937 and is largely remembered for the effort he put into creating numerous parks and boulevards throughout the city, particularly Seven Bridges Road and Skyline Parkway. The City Administration makes policy proposals to a nine-member City Council. Duluth's five representational districts are divided into 36 precincts. Each district elects its own councilor. There are also four at-large councilors, representing the entire city. The City Council elects a president who presides at meetings.

Duluth is the heart of the state's 7th legislative district, represented in the Minnesota Senate by Jen McEwen and in the Minnesota House of Representatives by Jennifer Schultz (District 7A) and Liz Olson (District 7B), all members of the Democratic-Farmer-Labor Party, which has long dominated the city's politics.

Education

Local colleges and universities include the University of Minnesota Duluth (UMD); the UMD campus includes a medical school. The UMD Bulldogs won the Division I National Hockey Championship in 2011, 2018 and 2019. Other schools include The College of St. Scholastica, Lake Superior College, and Duluth Business University. The University of Wisconsin–Superior and Wisconsin Indianhead Technical College are in nearby Superior, Wisconsin.

Most public schools are administered by Duluth Public Schools. The schools have open enrollment. ISD 709 (Independent School District number 709) is now undertaking a reconstruction of all area schools under a program called the "Red Plan." The Red Plan's goals are the reconstruction of some older schools to meet new educational guidelines, and the construction of four new school buildings. The new schools will result in the redistricting of many students. As of 2009, the Red Plan was and is being contested in court by some citizens because of the cost of implementing the plan and because of the choice of construction management contractor.

Several independent and public charter schools also serve Duluth students. The largest is Duluth Edison Charter Schools, a public charter school covering grades K-8. Marshall School, a private college preparatory school founded as Duluth Cathedral in 1904, covers grades 4–12. Duluth has four Catholic schools with coverage up to grades 6 or 8, two Protestant schools, two Montessori schools, and six other charter and private schools.

Due to its proximity to the Great Lakes, Duluth is the location for the Large Lakes Observatory. The Large Lakes Observatory operates the largest university-owned research vessel in the Great Lakes, the R/V Blue Heron. Built in 1985 for fishing on the Grand Banks, the Blue Heron was purchased by the University of Minnesota in 1997, sailed from Portland, Maine, up the St. Lawrence Seaway to Duluth, and converted into a limnological research vessel during the winter of 1997–98. The Blue Heron is part of the University National Oceanographic Laboratory System and is available for charter by research scientists on any of the Great Lakes.

Media

Local newspapers include the monthly BusinessNorth and the twice-weekly Duluth News Tribune. Free newspapers include the Transistor, The Zenith, and The Reader Weekly.

Locally based nationally distributed magazines include Lake Superior Magazine and New Moon Magazine.

Infrastructure

Transportation
The Duluth area marks the northern endpoint of Interstate Highway 35, which stretches south to Laredo, Texas. U.S. Highways that serve the area are U.S. Highway 53, which stretches from La Crosse, Wisconsin, to International Falls, and U.S. Highway 2, which stretches from Everett, Washington, to St. Ignace, in the Upper Peninsula of Michigan. The southwestern part of the city has Thompson Hill, where travelers entering Duluth on I-35 can see most of Duluth, including the Aerial Lift Bridge and the waterfront. There are two freeway connections from Duluth to Superior. U.S. 2 provides a connection into Superior via the Richard I. Bong Memorial Bridge; and Interstate 535 runs concurrently with U.S. 53 over the John Blatnik Bridge.

Many state highways serve the area. Highway 23 runs diagonally across Minnesota, indirectly connecting Duluth to Sioux Falls, South Dakota. Highway 33 provides a western bypass of Duluth connecting Interstate 35, which comes up from the Twin Cities to U.S. 53, which leads to Iron Range cities and International Falls. Highway 61 provides access to Thunder Bay, Ontario, via the North Shore of Lake Superior. Highway 194 provides a spur route into the city of Duluth known as "Central Entrance" and Mesaba Avenue. Wisconsin Highway 13 reaches along Lake Superior's South Shore.

Highway 61 and parts of Highways 2 and 53 are segments of the Lake Superior Circle Tour route that follows Lake Superior through Minnesota, Ontario, Michigan, and Wisconsin.

The local bus system is run by the Duluth Transit Authority, which serves Duluth, Hermantown, Proctor and Superior, Wisconsin. The DTA runs a system of buses manufactured by Gillig, including new hybrids.  Duluth is also served by Skyline Shuttle, with daily service to the Minneapolis-Saint Paul International Airport, and Jefferson Lines, with daily service to the Twin Cities.

Duluth was connected to Minneapolis by the North Star passenger train from 1978 to 1985. A proposal to restore service between the Twin Cities and the Twin Ports, the Northern Lights Express, was first made in 2000 and detailed plans and environmental assessments have been completed, but the project has yet to be fully funded. The North Shore Scenic Railroad operated seasonal excursion trains on its line to Two Harbors. The former Duluth, Missabe and Iron Range Railway, now part of the Canadian National Railway, operates taconite-hauling trains in the area. Duluth is also served by the BNSF Railway, the Canadian Pacific Railway, and the Union Pacific Railroad.

Duluth International Airport serves the city and surrounding region with daily flights to Minneapolis and Chicago. Nearby municipal airports are Duluth Sky Harbor on Minnesota Point and the Richard I. Bong Airport in Superior. Both the Bong Airport and Bong Bridge are named for famed World War II pilot and highest-scoring American World War II air ace Major Richard Ira "Dick" Bong, a native of nearby Poplar, Wisconsin.

Major highways
  Interstate 35
  Interstate 535
  U.S. Highway 2
  U.S. Highway 53
  Minnesota State Highway 23
  Minnesota State Highway 61 – North Shore
  Minnesota State Highway 194 – Central Entrance – Mesaba Avenue
  Minnesota State Highway 210
  Saint Louis County Road 4 – Rice Lake Road

Port of Duluth-Superior
At the western end of the Saint Lawrence Seaway, the Duluth–Superior port is North America's largest and farthest-inland freshwater port. With  of waterfront, it is one of North America's leading bulk cargo ports and ranks among the top 20 ports in the U.S. Duluth is a major shipping port for taconite pellets, made from concentrated low-grade iron ore and destined for midwestern and eastern steel mills. The arrival schedule of the ships that pass under the bridge is available, and locals and visitors gather to watch them enter the harbor. Despite their size, large sections of the Great Lakes freeze over in winter, interrupting most shipping from January to March.

Two types of ships regularly enter the port, the lakers and the salties. The lakers, which comprise over 90% of the port traffic, are the larger cargo ships built specially to sail the Great Lakes, with the largest ones over 1,000 feet long. They are mostly self-unloaders, with a long boom mounted on the upper deck. Their traffic is limited to the Great Lakes because they are too large to fit through the St. Lawrence Seaway.

The salties are smaller ships with a maximum size of 740 feet. Typically, they have sharply cutaway bows as compared to the lakers' vertical bows, and a series of cranes rising above their decks. They are small enough to navigate the St. Lawrence Seaway. Other than their size they can also be identified by their color, often blue, red, or green, while the lakers are generally black or rust.

Utilities
Duluth gets electric power from Duluth-based Minnesota Power, a subsidiary of ALLETE Corporation. Minnesota Power produces energy at generation facilities located throughout northern Minnesota and a generation plant in North Dakota. The latter supplies electricity into the MP system by the Square Butte HVDC line, which ends near the town.

Minnesota Power primarily uses western coal to generate electricity, but also has a number of small hydroelectric facilities, the largest of which is the Thomson Dam southwest of Duluth on the Saint Louis River.

In December 2006, Minnesota Power began purchasing all the energy generated from the new 50-MW Oliver Wind I Energy Center built by NextEra Resources near Center, N.D. In 2007, Minnesota Power entered into a second 25-year wind power purchase agreement with NextEra. A 48-MW facility was built adjacent to the initial Oliver County wind farm, and the new generators began commercial operation in November 2007.

Construction began in 2010 on the 76-MW Bison Wind I Energy Center near New Salem, N.D. Bison I represents the first wave of Minnesota Power-constructed wind farms that will be built in south central North Dakota and linked to Minnesota. by way of a  direct current (DC) transmission line. ALLETE finalized an agreement January 1, 2010 to purchase a 250-kilovolt DC line between Center, N.D. and Hermantown, Minn. (near ALLETE headquarters in Duluth) and phase out a long-term contract to buy coal-generated electricity now transmitted over the line.

Because of wind energy demand, Duluth has recently become a port for wind energy parts shipments from overseas and the Midwestern hub for shipments out to various wind energy sites.

Duluth's water supply is sourced from Lake Superior and treated at the Lakewood Water Treatment Plant. The plant's oldest structure, the Lakewood Pumphouse, was built in 1896 in Romanesque Revival style, replacing older facilities that had been unable to prevent a typhoid epidemic. It was designed by William Patton. A 42-inch original main from 1896, one of two leaving the facility with clean, treated water, is still in use today. The system supplies approximately 100,000 people in Duluth and nearby towns.

Throughout its history, Duluth's sewers have overflowed when it rained, causing untreated sewage to flow into Lake Superior and the Saint Louis River. Over the past five years the City of Duluth has taken extraordinary measures to eliminate sewage overflows and in 2013, the improvements are three years ahead of schedule.

Fire department
The city of Duluth is protected by 132 paid, professional firefighters of the city of Duluth Fire Department. The Duluth Fire Department responded to 12,231 fire and emergency medical calls in 2015.

The Duluth Fire Department operates out of eight fire stations throughout the city, under the command of an Assistant Chief, Squad 251. The department also operates a fire apparatus fleet of six engines, one tower ladder, two quints, one heavy-duty rescue, two light medical response vehicles, and numerous other special, support, and reserve units.

Notable people

Duluth innovations

Duluth Pack portage packs

A Duluth pack is a traditional portage pack used in canoe travel. A specialized type of backpack, Duluth packs are nearly square in order to fit easily in the bottom of a canoe. The Duluth pack has its roots in a French-Canadian named Camille Poirier. Arriving in Duluth in 1870 with a small stock of leather and tools, he began a shoe store in what was then a booming frontier town on the shores of Lake Superior. Out of his small shoe shop on the waterfront, Poirier began building a new style of canoe pack with a tumpline, sternum strap, and umbrella holder. Patented by Poirier in 1882, the original #3 Duluth packs have changed little since they were first introduced. He sold the backpack business to the company that now does business as Duluth Pack, which has its main outlet store in the Canal Park area.

Pie à la Mode

The dessert pie à la Mode, a slice of pie topped by a scoop of ice cream, was first invented and named by John Gieriet in Duluth in 1885. But Charles Watson Townsend's 1936 New York Times obituary claimed that he was the inventor, and a controversy developed. A St. Paul Pioneer Press reporter read Townsend's obituary and realized that the Times had incorrectly attributed the invention to Townsend. Wanting to set the record straight, on May 23, 1936, the Pioneer Press ran a story about how the dessert was really invented at a Superior Street restaurant in Duluth in the 1880s, and indicated that the restaurant served ice cream with blueberry pie specifically. This was over a decade before Townsend first ordered pie with ice cream in New York, making Duluth the true birthplace of pie à la Mode.

Electric elevator

In 1887, inventor Alexander Miles of Duluth patented an electric elevator. Although not the first elevator, the design was important for improving the method of opening and closing elevator doors, as well as closing the opening to the elevator shaft when an elevator was between floors. At that time, elevator patrons or operators were required to manually shut a door to cut off access to the shaft, and Miles created an automatic mechanism that closed that access.

First mall in the United States

The Lake View Store was the first modern indoor mall in the United States. It was built in 1915, and is in the former U.S. Steel company town of Morgan Park, now the Duluth neighborhood Morgan Park. It was estimated that 10,000 people toured the mall on its opening day. The building has two stories and a full basement, and shops were originally on all three levels. All the stores were inside the mall, with some accessible from both inside and out. The first floor had a pharmacy and a department store with groceries, a butcher shop, clothing, hardware, furniture, and a general store. The second floor had a bank, dentist office, barbershop, hair salon, hat shop, billiard room, and auditorium. The basement had a shoe store and an ice making plant that made eight tons of ice per day. The building and the department store were owned and operated by U.S. Steel, but the pharmacy, bank, barbershop, hair salon, and dentist were privately run.

Chun King, Jeno's Pizza Rolls, and Bellisio Frozen Foods

Duluth was the home of food magnate Jeno Paulucci. While working as a wholesale grocer in Hibbing in the late 1940s, Paulucci noticed a growing market for prepared Chinese food. Borrowing $2,500 from a friend (c. $30,000 in 2020), he started canning chow mein "seasoned to [his] own Italian taste", and selling it to retailers under the label Chun King. Chun King came to encompass an entire line of prepared Chinese food, at that time not available in grocery stores. In 1966, he sold his enterprise for $63 million ($509 million in 2020). In 1968 Paulucci founded Jeno's Inc., a company that sold frozen pizzas and a variety of other "Italian" foods. The most notable of these was the pizza roll, a snack food consisting of Italian filling in an egg roll wrapper. In 1985, Paulucci sold Jeno's Inc. for $135 million ($329 million in 2020). In the 1990s, he started Bellisio Foods, a leading diversified frozen food company named after Paulucci's familial home village in Bellisio Solfare, Italy.

First whole-plane parachute system on a certified aircraft

    
In association with southern Minnesota company Ballistic Recovery Systems (BRS), Duluth-based aircraft manufacturing company Cirrus Aircraft developed the Cirrus Airframe Parachute System (CAPS), the first whole-plane, emergency parachute recovery system to be installed on a line of type certified aircraft, the Cirrus SR20 and SR22. A solid-fuel rocket housed in the fuselage is used to pull the parachute out from its housing and deploy the canopy full within seconds. It is designed to save the pilot and passengers by lowering the entire aircraft down to the ground in case of an emergency or structural failure. To date, CAPS has saved over 150 lives. The Cirrus management and design teams have won many awards for their efforts, including the 2016 Joseph T. Nall Safety Award.

CAPS was conceived by Cirrus founders brothers Dale and Alan Klapmeier after Alan survived a deadly mid-air collision in the mid-1980s, which inspired them to develop the device. It was first tested over the high desert of southern California in 1998 by the late author, Cirrus test pilot and Minnesota Air National Guard pilot Scott D. Anderson. Anderson died the following year when his plane crashed about 400 meters from the Duluth International Airport during an experimental test flight assessing changes Cirrus planned to use in production. The plane he was testing was the first off the production line and had not yet been equipped with CAPS. Anderson was posthumously inducted into the Minnesota Aviation Hall of Fame in 2010.

In popular culture
 F. Scott Fitzgerald's novel The Great Gatsby (1925) has scenes that take place in Duluth and on the shores of Lake Superior.
 Minnesota: Land of Plenty (1942) – documentary short film by James A. FitzPatrick.
 You'll Like My Mother (1972) – feature film shot in and around Duluth, principally at Glensheen Historic Estate.
 Far North (1988) – feature film, directed by Sam Shepard and starring Jessica Lange, shot in and around Duluth.
 Iron Will (1994) – Walt Disney Pictures movie filmed in Duluth substituting for 1917 Winnipeg.
 The short-lived television sitcom The Louie Show (1996), starring comedian Louie Anderson, is set in Duluth and features downtown Duluth buildings in its opening title sequence.
 A series of suspense novels by author Brian Freeman (starting with Immoral in 2005) take place in and around Duluth and feature real locations from the city.
 The sports comedy film Leatherheads (2008), co-starring George Clooney and Renée Zellweger, is set in Duluth and features a fictitious 1920s pro football team partially based on the Duluth Eskimos.
 The first season of the FX TV series Fargo (2014), inspired by the 1996 film of the same name, is mainly set in and around Bemidji and Duluth.
 Merry Kiss Cam (2022) – romantic comedy film set and shot entirely in Duluth.

Sister cities
Duluth has five sister cities:

  Isumi, Chiba Prefecture, Japan
  Petrozavodsk, Karelia, Russia
  Ranya, Kurdistan Region, Iraq
  Thunder Bay, Ontario, Canada
  Växjö, Kronoberg, Sweden

See also

 Darling's Observatory
 Duluth model
 Federal Prison Camp, Duluth
 Oliver G. Traphagen House
 USS Duluth, 2 ships

Notes

References

Further reading

 Bartlett, Elizabeth Ann. Making Waves: Grassroots Feminism in Duluth and Superior (Minnesota Historical Society Press, 2016). xvi, 325 pp.
 
 Macdonald, Dora Mary (1950). This is Duluth. Central High School Printing Department. Reprinted by Paradigm Press (1999).

External links

 City of Duluth
 Duluth Area Chamber of Commerce
 Visit Duluth
 Destination Duluth
 

 
Duluth–Superior metropolitan area
Cities in St. Louis County, Minnesota
County seats in Minnesota
Minnesota populated places on Lake Superior
Inland port cities and towns of the United States
Populated places established in the 1850s
Cities in Minnesota